The Provisional All-Russian Government (PA-RG), informally known as The Directory, The Ufa Directory, or The Omsk Directory, was a short-lived government during the Russian Civil War, formed on 23 September 1918 at the State Conference in Ufa as a result of a forced and extremely unstable compromise of various anti-Communist forces in eastern Russia. It was dissolved two months later after the coup, which had brought Admiral Alexander Kolchak to power in Communist-free areas of eastern Russia.

The Government was formed from the Committee of Members of the Constituent Assembly (mainly SR and KD members based in Samara) and from the Provisional Siberian Government (consisted mainly of regional politicians and rightist officers and based in Omsk). The two régimes had previously failed to work effectively together, with rivalry leading to a customs war and to numerous border disputes.

Formation 

A State Conference took place at Ufa between 8 and 23 September 1918, which resulted in the establishment of this alternative to the Russian Republic and then when that was overthrown by the Bolshevik government. It encompassed 170 delegates, including some from other regions. 

According to William Henry Chamberlin, "Partly under pressure from the Czechs, who were becoming impatient at the inability of the anti-Bolshevik Russians, whom they had been aiding, to help themselves, a state conference, attended by representatives of the Omsk and Samara Governments and other numerous political organizations and regional authorities, opened in Ufa on September 8 for the purpose of working out some scheme of political and military unity. The radicals at Ufa wished to make the new government, which was to be created, responsible before the original Constituent Assembly; the conservatives wanted to make it as authoritarian and as free from external control as possible..." A compromise resulted with the formation of a five man Directory, but the Constituent Assembly would resume activity if 250 member gathered by 1 January 1919, or 170 by 1 February.

The five person Directory had their deputies, personal backup members of the Directory, some of whom were located at a considerable distance from Ufa.

The Council of Ministers carried out the day-to-day administration of the government. A majority of the Council of Ministers (10 out of 14) had served formerly as members of the Provisional Siberian Government.

Views
The Act on the Formation of the All-Russian Supreme Power established that the PA-RG “is the only bearer of supreme power throughout the entire Russia until the convocation of the Constituent Assembly”. The Act provided "the transfer of all the functions temporarily assigned by the regional governments" to the PA-RG. Thus, the sovereignty of regional formations was canceled and replaced by "broad autonomy of regions", which limits completely depended on the "wisdom of the Provisional All-Russian Government".

The foundations of the national state structure of Russia should have proceeded from federal principles: “the organization of liberated Russia on the basis of recognizing of broad autonomy for its individual areas, due to geographic, economic and ethnic characteristics; assuming the final establishment of the federal government by the sovereign Constituent Assembly ..., recognition of right for cultural and national self-determination for the minorities that do not occupy a separate territory".

The following were named as urgent tasks to restore the state unity and independence of Russia:

Struggle for the liberation of Russia from the Soviet government;
Reunification of the torn away, fallen away and scattered regions of Russia;
Non-recognition of the Brest and all other treaties, concluded both on behalf of Russia and its individual parts after the February Revolution, by any government, except for the Russian Provisional Government; restoration of the actual force of contractual relations with the Entente powers;
Continuation of the war against the German coalition.

Activity 

On October 9, the Directory left Ufa and moved to Omsk due to the threat of the capture of Ufa by the advancing Soviet troops. On October 13, the former commander of the Black Sea Fleet Vice Admiral Alexander Kolchak arrived in Omsk, who later became a member of the Council of Ministers of the PA-RG. On November 4, the Government appealed to the regions with a demand to immediately dissolve "all Regional Governments and Representative Institutions without exception" and transfer all powers to the All-Russian Government (Council of Ministers).
Such a centralization of state was justified by the need to "recreate the homeland's combat power, which is so necessary in the time of the struggle for the revival of Great and United Russia", and "to create the necessary conditions to supply the army and organize the rear". On the same day, on the basis of the Provisional Siberian Government, the executive body of the Directory was formed — the All-Russian Council of Ministers, headed by Pyotr Vologodsky. Now it was possible to achieve the abolition of all regional, national and Cossack governments in the East of Russia and thereby formally consolidate the forces of anti-Bolshevik resistance.

Council of Ministers of the Provisional All-Russian Government 
The "All-Russian" Council of Ministers, formed on 4 November 1918, included:

Kolchak coup d'etat 
The Directory coup occurred on the night of 17 November 1918, when Krasilnikov's detachment burst onto a meeting of Avksentiev, Zenzinov, Rakov, Gendelman, three delegates from the Archangel Government, and Assistant Minister of the Interior Rogovsky. All of them were members of the Socialist-Revolutionary Party. Krasilnikov arrested Avksentiev and Zenzinov.  On 18 November, Premier Vologodosky called a meeting of the Cabinet, and soon there was general agreement the only solution to the political crisis was a personal dictatorship. Kolchak assumed the title of Supreme Ruler, "Commander-in-chief of all the land and naval forces of Russia." Avksentiev, Zenzinov, and Argunov were deported to Paris. Boldyrev also left the country.

The Council of Ministers came to the conclusion about the need for "the complete concentration of military and civil power in the hands of one person with an authoritative name in the military and public circles." It was decided in principle “to transfer temporarily the exercise of supreme power to one person, based on the assistance of the Council of Ministers, assigning to such a person the name of the Supreme Ruler", after which "the Regulations on the temporary structure of state power in Russia" (the so-called Constitution of November 18) was developed and adopted, which established the procedure for the relationship of the Council of Ministers and the Supreme Ruler.

Kolchak issued the following appeal to the population:

Included among Kolchak's ministers was former prominent Tsarist minister Sergey Sazonov, who would represent the government at the Paris Peace Conference.

A new Russian government was formed, in which nearly all of the member of the Directory's Council of Ministers retained their offices. It operated until January 4, 1920.

References 

 Evan Mawdsley, The Russian Civil War (2008). Edinburgh, Birlinn, pp. 143–8.

External links 
 Russian government documents
 Search Official Russian government documents, including historic ones

Omsk
Post–Russian Empire states
Provisional governments of the Russian Civil War
Russian Civil War
White Russia